The  Atlanta Falcons season was the franchise's 32nd season in the National Football League (NFL). It was their first season with new head coach Dan Reeves, who had been hired on January 21.

For the season, they added a new logo and added the numerals and socks on the road jerseys are switched from black to red.

The season was marked with tragedy, as team owner Rankin Smith died on October 26, 1997. The following week, the team wore a commemorative patch on their jerseys for the remainder of the season. The season was the last time Falcons started 0–5 until 2020.

Offseason

NFL draft

Personnel

Staff

Roster

Regular season

Schedule

Season summary

Week 7 at Saints

Standings

References

External links
 1997 Atlanta Falcons at Pro-Football-Reference.com

Atlanta Falcons
Atlanta Falcons seasons
Atlanta